Walter Young may refer to:

 Walter Young (American football) (born 1979), American football wide receiver
 Walter Young (athlete), Canadian runner, winner of the 1937 Boston Marathon
 Walter Young (baseball) (1980–2015), Major League player with the Baltimore Orioles
 Walter C. Young (born 1923), Florida state representative
 Walter D. Young (1933–1984), Canadian political scientist and author
 Walter H. Young (1902–?), American college football and basketball coach
 Walter James Young (1872–1940), Australian businessman
 Walter X. Young (1918–1942), United States Marine Corps officer during World War II
 Waddy Young (Walter Roland Young, 1916–1945), American football player and World War II bomber pilot
 Walter Young (minister) (1745–1814) Scottish minister, musician and collector of traditional songs

See also
 Walter Yonge (disambiguation)